Philip Martin Tabor (born November 30, 1956) is a former professional American football defensive lineman. Tabor played four seasons with the New York Giants.  He is the identical twin brother of former National Football League (NFL) player  Paul Tabor.

1956 births
Living people
Sportspeople from Little Rock, Arkansas
Players of American football from Arkansas
American football defensive tackles
American football defensive ends
Oklahoma Sooners football players
New York Giants players